Barren Mountain is a mountain standing approximately  , situated as one of the highest points on the Dorrigo Plateau, that is part of the Great Dividing Range, located in the Northern Tablelands and New England regions of New South Wales, Australia.

The area has given a name to a type of tree, Barren Mountain mallee (Eucalyptus approximans), which is abundant in the vicinity, however, has been assessed as a vulnerable and threatened species in the remainder of New South Wales.

References 

Mountains of New South Wales
New England (New South Wales)